Talakhamani was a Kushite King of Meroe during the second half of the 5th century BCE. No prenomen is known, and his nomen is Talakhamani. He may have been a son of Nasakhma and a younger brother of Malewiebamani. It is also possible Talakhamani is a son of Malewiebamani.

Talakhamani is known from a stela from his chapel which is now in Boston. According to an inscription in Kawa he died in his palace at Meroe. He is said to have been succeeded by Amanineteyerike at the age of 41.

Talakhamani's name is etymologically identical with that of King Talakhidamani, who ruled seven centuries later in the late 3rd or early 4th century AD.

References

5th-century BC monarchs of Kush